Before Dishonor may refer to:
a song by Hatebreed on the album Satisfaction Is the Death of Desire
a 2007 novel by Peter David, sequel to Vendetta (Star Trek)